Samnium is a Latin exonym for a region of Southern Italy anciently inhabited by the Samnites. Their own endonyms were Safinim for the country (attested in one inscription and one coin legend) and Safineis for the  The language of these endonyms and of the population was the Oscan language. However, not all the Samnites spoke Oscan, and not all the Oscan-speakers lived in Samnium.

Ancient geographers were unable to relay a precise definition of Samnium's borders. Moreover, the areas it included vary depending on the time period considered. The main configurations are the borders it had during the floruit of the Oscan speakers, from about 600 BC to about 290 BC, when it was finally absorbed by the Roman Republic.

The original territory of Samnium should not be confused with the later territory of the same name. Rome's first Emperor, Augustus, divided Italy into 11 regions. Although these entities only served administrative purposes, and were identified with the sole numeral, by scholarly convention the Regio IV has been dubbed "Samnium". Ancient Samnium had actually been divided into three of the Augustan regions.
Regions of Italy

Etymology
Etymologically the name Samnium is generally recognized to be a form of the name of the Sabines, who were Umbrians. From Safinim, Sabinus, Sabellus and Samnis an Indo-European root can be extracted, *-, which becomes Sab- in Latino-Faliscan and Saf- in Osco-Umbrian: Sabini and *Safineis. The eponymous god of the Sabines, Sabus, seems to support this view. The Greek terms, Saunitai and Saunitis, remain outside the group. Nothing is known of their origin.

At some point in prehistory, a population speaking a common language extended over both Samnium and Umbria. Salmon conjectures that it was common Italic and puts forward a date of 600 BC, after which the common language began to separate into dialects. This date does not necessarily correspond to any historical or archaeological evidence; developing a synthetic view of the ethnology of proto-historic Italy is an incomplete and ongoing task.

The linguist, Julius Pokorny, carries the etymology somewhat further back. Conjecturing that the -a- was altered from an -o- during some prehistoric residence in Illyria he derives the names from an o-grade extension *swo-bho- of an extended e-grade *swe-bho- of the possessive adjective, *s(e)we-, of the reflexive pronoun, *se-, "oneself" (the source of English self). The result is a set of Indo-European tribal names (if not the endonym of the Indo-Europeans): Germanic Suebi and Semnones, Suiones; Celtic Senones; Slavic Serbs and Sorbs; Italic Sabelli, Sabini, etc., as well as a large number of kinship terms. The general concept is "our own kith and kin," Pokorny's "von eigener Art," "Gesamtheit der eigenen Leute," "Liebe," "Sippegenossen," "Sippenangehörigen," and the like.

Historical geography

Samnium mostly lay on the Apennine area; it was delimited by Latium to the north, by Lucania to the south, by Campania to the west, and by Apulia to the east. The principal cities of the region were Bovaiamom, renamed Bovianum by Latins (today: Bojano or Boiano) and Maleventum (Maloenton in Oscan), which was later renamed Beneventum by the Romans (today: Benevento). For most of their history the Samnites were landlocked, but during a brief period they controlled parts of both coasts of the Italian peninsula.

The Samnites were composed of at least four tribes: the Pentri (capital: Bovianum), the Caraceni (principal cities: Cluviae, the modern Casoli, and Juvanum, the ruins of which are spread between Torricella Peligna and Montenerodomo), the Caudini (capital: Caudium, today Montesarchio) and the Hirpini (main cities: Beneventum, Abellinum, Aquilonia). They may have later been joined by the Frentani (capital Larinum, the modern Larino).

History
The earliest written record of the people is a treaty with the Romans from 354 BC, which set their border at the Liris River. Shortly thereafter the Samnite Wars broke out; they won an important battle against the Roman army in 321 BC, and their imperium reached its peak in 316 BC after further gains from the Romans. By 290 BC, the Romans were able to break the Samnites' power after some hard-fought battles. The Samnites were one of the Italian peoples that allied with King Pyrrhus of Epirus during the Pyrrhic War. After Pyrrhus left for Sicily, the Romans invaded Samnium and were crushed at the Battle of the Cranita hills, but after the defeat of Pyrrhus, the Samnites could not resist on their own and surrendered to Rome.  Some of the Samnites joined and aided Hannibal during the Second Punic War, but most stayed loyal. The Samnites and several other Italic people rebelled against Rome and started the  Social War (91–87 BC), after Romans refused to grant them Roman Citizenship. The war lasted almost three years, and resulted in a Roman victory. However, Samnites and other Italic tribes were granted Roman citizenship, to avoid another war. The Samnites supported the Populares in the civil war against Lucius Cornelius Sulla, but unfortunately for them, Sulla ended up winning the war and was declared the dictator of Rome. Sulla ordered all those who went against him to be punished. Thousands of people in Rome and all over Italy were brutally hunted down and killed. Samnites, who were one of the most prominent supporters of the Populares, were punished so severely that it was recorded "some of their cities have now dwindled into villages, some indeed being entirely deserted." Samnites did not play any prominent role in history after this, and they eventually became Latinized and assimilated into the Roman World

Prominent Samnites

Rulers of the Samnites 
 Gaius Pontius ca. 320s BC
 Gellius Egnatius ca. 296 BC

Uprising against Sulla 
 Gaius Papius Mutilus 90-89 with:
 Pontius Telesinus - Samnite commander to Papius

Roman citizens
 Pontius Pilate - the 5th Prefect of the Roman province of Judaea from AD 26–36.

Catholic Popes 
 Pope Felix IV

See also 
 Samnites
 Samnite Wars
 Hirpinia, a sub-region of Samnium

Notes

Bibliography

 
 .
 Grossmann, Lukas, Roms Samnitenkriege: historische und historiographische Untersuchungen zu den Jahren 327-290 v. Chr. (Düsseldorf, Wellem Verlag, 2009) (Reihe Geschichte, 1).
 Ross Cowan, Roman Conquests: Italy (Barnsley, 2009).

External links 
 Toponymy of Samnium